Gan Chao (born 13 February 1995) is a Chinese footballer currently playing as a midfielder for Chengdu Rongcheng.

Club career
Gan Chao would be promoted to the senior team of top tier club Guizhou Renhe during the 2014 Chinese Super League season. He would go on to eventually make his debut on 7 July 2015 in a Chinese FA Cup game against Jiangxi Liansheng in a 3-2 victory. Unfortunately he would be part of the squad that was relegated at the end of the of 2015 Chinese Super League campaign. Nevertheless he remained faithful towards the club even when they moved to Beijing and renamed themselves Beijing Renhe. Gan would gradually start to establish himself as a regular within the team and in the 2017 China League One campaign he would help the club gain promotion back into the top tier at the end of the season.

On 10 January 2018 second tier football club Shenzhen would sign Gan, for the 2018 China League One campaign. He would go on to make his debut in a league game on 11 March 2018 against Heilongjiang Lava Spring F.C. that ended in a 2-2 draw. He would go on to establish himself as a regular within the team and go on to gain another promotion with a different club at the end of his first season with Shenzhen. On 9 April 2021 he was loaned to second tier football club Chengdu Rongcheng. He would make his debut on 26 April 2021 in a league game against Jiangxi Beidamen, which ended in a 4-2 victory. At the end of the season he would establish himself as a regular within the team and aid them to promotion at the end of the 2021 league campaign.

Career statistics

Notes

References

External links

1995 births
Living people
Chinese footballers
Association football midfielders
China League One players
Chinese Super League players
Beijing Renhe F.C. players
Shenzhen F.C. players